Vexillum appelii is a species of small sea snail, marine gastropod mollusk in the family Costellariidae, the ribbed miters.

Description
The length of the shell attains 26.5 mm; its diameter 10 mm.

Distribution
This species occurs in the Red Sea.

References

 Turner H. 2001. Katalog der Familie Costellariidae Macdonald, 1860. Conchbooks. 1-100 page(s): 17
 Gori, S.; Rosado, J.; Salisbury, R. A. (2019). Costellariidae (Gastropoda) from Dhofar, Oman with descriptions of eight new species and notes on Vexillum appelii (Jickeli, 1874). Acta Conchyliorum. 18: 25-48.

External links
 Jickeli, C. F. (1874). Studien über die Conchylien des Rothen Meeres. I. Die Gattung Mitra Lam. Jahrbücher der Deutschen Malakozoologischen Gesellschaft. 1: 17-55.
  Adams, H. (1872). Further descriptions of new species of shells collected by Robert M'Andrew, Esq., in the Red Sea. Proceedings of the Zoological Society of London. 1872: 9-12, pl. 3.
 Cooke, A. H. (1885). Report on the testaceous Mollusca obtained during a dredging excursion in the Gulf of Suez in the months February and March 1869 by Robert MacAndrew. Republished, with additions and corrections. Part I. Annals and Magazine of Natural History. (5) 15: 322-339

appelii
Gastropods described in 1874